Cimarron River may refer to:

Cimarron River (Arkansas River tributary), a tributary of the Arkansas River with headwaters in New Mexico
Cimarron River (Canadian River tributary), a tributary of the Canadian River entirely within New Mexico
Cimarron River (Gunnison River tributary), a tributary of the Gunnison River in Colorado